Thabang Kamogelo Molaba  is a South African actor and model. He is best known for his role as KB Molapo in the Netflix series Blood & Water. He first gained prominence when he appeared on the Mzansi Magic telenovela The Queen.

Early life
Molaba was born and raised in Harrismith, Free State to parents Lisbeth and Richard, both of whom are teachers. He is Zulu and Sotho. He participated in drama at the local Tshiame Youth Club and took acting classes with Patricia Boyer before moving to Johannesburg. He graduated with a degree in logistics from Tshwane University of Technology.

Personal life
In July 2021, Molaba opened up about his experiences with therapy.

Filmography

References

External links

Thabang Molaba at TVSA

Living people
1994 births
21st-century South African male actors
Male web series actors
People from Harrismith
South African male models
South African male television actors
South African Sotho people
Tshwane University of Technology alumni
Zulu people